Dagnall is a village in England, UK.  

The name may also refer to:

Bob Dagnall
Charles Dagnall
Chris Dagnall
Harry Dagnall
Ken Dagnall
Thompson Dagnall

See also

 
 Dangal (disambiguation)